Climate change in Senegal will have wide reaching impacts on many aspects of life in Senegal. Climate change will cause an increase in average temperatures over west Africa by between 1.5 and 4 °C (3 °F and 7 °F) by mid-century, relative to 1986–2005. Projections of rainfall indicate an overall decrease in rainfall and an increase in intense mega-storm events over the Sahel. The sea level is expected to rise faster in West Africa than the global average. Although Senegal is currently not a major contributor to global greenhouse gas emissions, it is one of the most vulnerable countries to climate change.

Extreme drought is impacting agriculture, and causing food and job insecurity. More than 70% of the population is employed in the agricultural sector. Sea level rise and resulting coastal erosion is expected to cause damage to coastal infrastructure and displace a large percentage of the population living in coastal areas. Climate change also has the potential to increase land degradation that will likely increase desertification in eastern Senegal, leading to an expansion of the Sahara.

Climate change adaptation policies and plans are important to help Senegal prepare and adapt. In 2006, Senegal submitted its National Adaptation Programme of Action (NAPA) to the United Nations Framework Convention on Climate Change. The NAPA identifies water resources, agriculture, and coastal zones as the country's most vulnerable sectors. In 2015, Senegal released its Intended Nationally Determined Contributions (INDC's) that indicated climate change would be treated as a national priority.

Greenhouse gas emissions 

Senegal is currently not a major contributor to global greenhouse gas emissions. The country contributes less than a ton of CO2 per person per year (compared to the global average of over 6 tons per person per year) and placing 150th in the list of countries by  emissions. However, it is one of the most vulnerable countries to climate change.

Energy consumption 

Most energy in Senegal is produced from fossil fuels, predominantly diesel and gas. A small portion of Senegal's energy comes from renewable energy, such as the Manantali Dam in Mali and a new wind farm in Thiès.

Fossil fuel production 
Historically, Senegal was not a major producer of fossil fuels but significant discoveries in natural gas, have led to a major increase in production.

Impacts on the natural environment

Temperature and weather changes 
West Africa is expected to be affected by climate change caused by rising temperatures, decreased rainfall, increased mega-storms and rising sea levels. Projections of rainfall indicate an overall decrease in rainfall and an increase in intense mega-storm events over the Sahel.

Sea level rise

The sea level is expected to rise faster in West Africa then the global average.

Water resources 
The main water resources in Senegal are dependent on rainfall. Rainfall deficits and increased variability due to climate change will likely reduce aquifer recharge rates. Major population centers are already realizing saltwater intrusion into aquifers and arable land.  Sea level rise and decreased rainfall will exacerbate salinity issues. As more saltwater intrusion happens, this will threaten fish stock in the country.

Ecosystems 

The combination of increased temperatures and decreased rainfall will likely increase desertification in eastern Senegal, leading to expansion of the Sahara.

Impacts on people

Economic impacts

Agriculture 
Like in other parts of West Africa, the expected extreme weather including more severe drought in the Sahel region is expected to greatly effect food security and agricultural yields.

Climate change is likely to result in reduced yields of key crops, including sorghum and millet, placing pressure on rural livelihoods since agriculture employs about 70% of the population of Senegal. For example, some projections suggest that between 2000 - 2009 there was a 10 -20% reduction in millet and a 5 - 15% reduction in sorghum yields due to climate change. Climate change adaptation for millet and sorghum include options such as increasing crop tolerances to high temperatures during the flowering period and increasing cultivars’ thermal time requirement.

Moreover, animal herding communities, which include about 2.5 million people in the broader Sahel region, will be severally impacted, because weather variability will lead to increased overgrazing, pressure on water supplies, and subsequent effects on the economic viability of herding communities. For example, in 2017, pressures on lands led to increased demand for manufactured animal feed, causing prices to skyrocket and farmers to sell large portions of their herds.

Impacts on housing 
Sea level rise is expected to displace a large percentage of Senegal's population. Nearly 70% of the population lives in coastal zones. The government is already moving communities in high-risk flood areas. Additionally nearly 90% of industry in Senegal is in that same coastal region. Extreme weather events and coastal flooding could jeopardize these major economic centers.

Mitigation and adaptation

Policies and legislation 
In 2006, Senegal initiated a National Adaptation Programme of Action (NAPA) as part of the larger trend to create National Adaptation Plans. A National Committee on Climate Change was appointed by presidential degree to support the program. Additionally, there is a Climate Fund that is an instrument of climate finance.

International cooperation 
In 2015, Senegal released its Nationally Determined Contributions (NDC's) that indicated climate change would be treated as a national priority.

Society and culture

Activism 
At the same time that these policies are in place, there is evidence that they are not fully being acted on. For example, an article in The Nation focused on climate justice described how a coal fire power plan was built in Bargny, Senegal, a site that had been identified by the government as a displacement location for communities displaced by sea level rise.

References 

Senegal
Environment of Senegal
Senegal